Kingsmead School (KS) is  a coeducational state school in Wiveliscombe, Somerset, England, serving the north-west of Taunton Deane district. It had 804 pupils between the ages of 11 and 16 years in 2013.

The school was awarded Beacon School status in 1998 which was renewed in 2002. In September 2000, Kingsmead gained Language College status. In December 2009 Kingsmead received an Outstanding judgement from Ofsted and Good in 2013. In April 2011, Kingsmead became an Academy.

History

The original block at Kingsmead was modelled in a late Art Deco style, hence its similarities in appearance to an mid-century-modern cinema. The main part of the school (including the hall, gymnasium, canteen, science labs, library, cloakrooms and classrooms) was built during the early 1950s, when a rise in the number of children in post-war Britain (also known as the "baby boom" era) lead to a demand for more schools across the country. The main block was extended at either ends during the 1970s, and during this period a second block (now the Language College) was constructed. A sports hall was built to the rear of the school next to the staff car park during the early 1990s, along with several new offices for senior management near the drama studio. The second most recent significant development is the "south block", a million pound construction with 7 new classrooms and an ICT room; opened September 2006. The infrastructure of the school was never designed for nearly 800 pupils, so the school relies on the field to the back of the school during the summer months for pupils at break and lunchtime.

A new science block opened in 2014, and in 2015 received a grant for new building work. Further funding for building work was obtained in 2017. A new main block will replace the old main block that sadly has concrete cancer the new block will be constructed on the place of the tennis courts and the old block will be replaced with a new set of tennis courts there are no confirmed dates for the new build but we are reliably informed it is in the near future this new process is known to some students as R.A.P ops. A mural was added at the entrance to the east block in 2017. And another was added to the school entrance featuring famous and inspirational people such as nelson Mandela Albert Einstein and Vladimir Ilyich Ulyanov. In 2021, work began on the £13million new building to replace the Main Block. The build had previously been delayed in construction due to the COVID-19 pandemic.

Zambia fund

Since 1999 Kingsmead has upheld a partnership with two schools in the Copperbelt region which is situated in Northern Zambia. First the headteacher from one of the schools in Kitwe came to Somerset and then 8 teachers from Kingsmead went to Zambia. They visited Mukuba Boys School and Helen Kaunda Girls Secondary School. Each year, 12 pupils are selected to take part in the exchange programme. First the Zambian pupils come to Kingsmead and then the British pupils head out to Zambia. Then the following year it is the turn of the teachers. When the British pupils head over they take crates of educational resources. These are filled with books, pencils, pens, paper and other learning essentials. The school has set up the 'Kingsmead International Trust' to help the people of Kitwe in Zambia who are unable to attend school because of AIDS and other problems commonly faced by African people. The trust is a registered charity.

References

External links
 

Academies in Somerset
Secondary schools in Somerset
Wiveliscombe